Lacera asinuosa is a moth of the family Erebidae. It is found on Java, Bali and Flores and in New Guinea. The habitat consists of montane areas.

References

Moths described in 1979
Lacera
Moths of Indonesia
Moths of New Guinea